The Innocent was the band Trent Reznor of Nine Inch Nails played with after leaving Option 30. He then moved on to the Exotic Birds before creating his own band, Nine Inch Nails. The other members were Alan Greenblatt (as Alan Greene), Kevin Valentine, Rodney Cajka (as Rodney Psyka) and Albritton McClain. Valentine and McClain were both members of Donnie Iris and the Cruisers, and they had just recently opted to go on their own way from the band.  The band's sole album was released on the regional Red Label Records.

After releasing their only album, Livin' in the Street, Reznor left the band. He joined Exotic Birds and contributed to the local band Slam Bamboo, before eventually forming Nine Inch Nails.

Livin' in the Street

"Livin' in the Street" – 3:47
"Freeway Ride" – 4:08
"Dora" – 4:41
"With You" – 3:50
"Heartzone" – 4:57
"Top Secret" – 4:01
"Love'll Come Knockin'" – 4:39
"Back in My Life" – 4:10 *On some editions of the album, this track is unlisted and "Queen Of The Border" is listed as the eighth track in its stead.
"Queen of the Border" – 4:42
"The Names Have Been Changed" – 3:43

References

External links
Discography at 9inchnails.com

Trent Reznor
American glam metal musical groups
American hard rock musical groups
American pop rock music groups
Heavy metal musical groups from Ohio
Musical groups established in 1983
Musical groups disestablished in 1985
Musical groups from Cleveland